AB Lietuvos Dujos was a natural gas company in Lithuania. It was established in 1961 as an integrated gas company for import, transmission, distribution and sale of natural gas. After privatization in the 1990s, its major shareholders became Gazprom and E.ON Ruhrgas.  In 2009, the company operated around 1,800 km of trunk pipelines and 7,900 km of distribution pipelines, and employed around 1,820 people. In 2013, its transmission business was spun-off into a separate company Amber Grid. In 2014, Gazprom and E.ON sold their stakes to the state-owned energy company Lietuvos Energija. On 1 January 2016, Lietuvos Dujos was merged into Energijos Skirstymo Operatorius.

References

1961 establishments in Lithuania
Natural gas companies of Lithuania
Natural gas companies of the Soviet Union
Non-renewable resource companies established in 1961
Non-renewable resource companies disestablished in 2016
Companies based in Vilnius
Defunct energy companies of the Soviet Union
Defunct companies of Lithuania